William Burton MacDiarmid (23 May 1875 – 13 May 1947) was a Liberal party member of the House of Commons of Canada. He was born in Athol, Ontario and became a physician by career.

MacDiarmid graduated from McGill University where he received his medical degree (MDCM). He became a Health Officer in the communities of Maxville and Roxborough Township.

He was first elected to Parliament at the Glengarry riding in the 1940 general election and re-elected in 1945. MacDiarmid resigned on 22 June 1945 to allow William Lyon Mackenzie King to campaign for and hold the riding in a by-election after King had suffered personal defeat in the general election in his riding of Prince Albert. MacDiarmid died unexpectedly on 13 May 1947 at his residence in Maxville due to heart failure.

References

External links
 

1875 births
1947 deaths
Physicians from Ontario
Liberal Party of Canada MPs
Members of the House of Commons of Canada from Ontario
McGill University Faculty of Medicine alumni